Au nom de la loi ("In The Name of the Law") is a limited-run Quebecois téléroman series on Ici Radio-Canada Télé. Ten 50-minute episodes were broadcast from September 15, 2005 to November 17, 2005.

Synopsis
In 1993, Simon Pelletier is sentenced to life in prison for murder. Protesting his innocence, he reaches the end of his tether after twelve years of prison and legal proceedings. He escapes, and with the help of Scorpion, an ex-convict, he kidnaps Lavigne, a police officer who took part in his conviction.

Cast
Patrick Huard as Simon Pelletier
Jacynthe René as Céline Desjardins
Louis Champagne as Scorpion
Réal Bossé as Marc Lavigne
Rosalie Julien as Nadine Théorêt
Benoît Gouin as Robert Duranleau
Marie Turgeon as Judith Castonguay
Mélanie Pilon as Liliane Lacroix
Nicolas Canuel as Raynald Jetté
Jean Harvey as François Perreault
Mélissa Flynn as Diane Piché
Jean Petitclerc as Daniel Bernier
Suzanne Garceau as Denise Desjardins
Évelyne Rompré as Julie Lavigne
Denis Bernard as Jean-Luc Therrien
Violette Chauveau as Lucille Therrien
Sophie Bourgeois as Anne Beauchamp
Bobby Beshro as Tomek Rudnicki
Pierre Chagnon as Maître Delorme

External links
  Official site
  Page at IMDb

Television shows set in Quebec
Ici Radio-Canada Télé original programming
Téléromans
2005 Canadian television series debuts
2005 Canadian television series endings
2000s Canadian drama television series